The Novokuybyshevsk Constituency (No.151) was a Russian legislative constituency in the Samara Oblast. The constituency covered Samara suburbs, Novokuybyshevsk and rural northern Samara Oblast. In 2016 redistricting the constituency was dismantled with Novokuybyshevsk being placed into Samara constituency, Chapayevsk into Zhigulyovsk constituency, east-central Samara Oblast (including Kinel and Otradny) into Promyshlenny constituency, while northern Samara Oblast was united with northern Samara into new Krasnoglinsky constituency.

Members

Election results

1993

|-
! colspan=2 style="background-color:#E9E9E9;text-align:left;vertical-align:top;" |Candidate
! style="background-color:#E9E9E9;text-align:left;vertical-align:top;" |Party
! style="background-color:#E9E9E9;text-align:right;" |Votes
! style="background-color:#E9E9E9;text-align:right;" |%
|-
|style="background-color:#E98282"|
|align=left|Galina Gusarova
|align=left|Women of Russia
|
|52.94%
|-
| colspan="5" style="background-color:#E9E9E9;"|
|- style="font-weight:bold"
| colspan="3" style="text-align:left;" | Total
| 
| 100%
|-
| colspan="5" style="background-color:#E9E9E9;"|
|- style="font-weight:bold"
| colspan="4" |Source:
|
|}

1995

|-
! colspan=2 style="background-color:#E9E9E9;text-align:left;vertical-align:top;" |Candidate
! style="background-color:#E9E9E9;text-align:left;vertical-align:top;" |Party
! style="background-color:#E9E9E9;text-align:right;" |Votes
! style="background-color:#E9E9E9;text-align:right;" |%
|-
|style="background-color:"|
|align=left|Valentin Romanov
|align=left|Communist Party
|
|49.38%
|-
|style="background-color:"|
|align=left|Vera Lekareva
|align=left|Our Home – Russia
|
|19.81%
|-
|style="background-color:"|
|align=left|Sergey Salnikov
|align=left|Liberal Democratic Party
|
|10.28%
|-
|style="background-color:"|
|align=left|Valery Ageev
|align=left|Independent
|
|8.78%
|-
|style="background-color:#000000"|
|colspan=2 |against all
|
|9.04%
|-
| colspan="5" style="background-color:#E9E9E9;"|
|- style="font-weight:bold"
| colspan="3" style="text-align:left;" | Total
| 
| 100%
|-
| colspan="5" style="background-color:#E9E9E9;"|
|- style="font-weight:bold"
| colspan="4" |Source:
|
|}

1999

|-
! colspan=2 style="background-color:#E9E9E9;text-align:left;vertical-align:top;" |Candidate
! style="background-color:#E9E9E9;text-align:left;vertical-align:top;" |Party
! style="background-color:#E9E9E9;text-align:right;" |Votes
! style="background-color:#E9E9E9;text-align:right;" |%
|-
|style="background-color:"|
|align=left|Valentin Romanov (incumbent)
|align=left|Communist Party
|
|45.06%
|-
|style="background-color:"|
|align=left|Oleg Dyachenko
|align=left|Independent
|
|38.33%
|-
|style="background-color:"|
|align=left|Konstantin Glodev
|align=left|Independent
|
|2.80%
|-
|style="background-color:#084284"|
|align=left|Vyacheslav Volov
|align=left|Spiritual Heritage
|
|2.73%
|-
|style="background-color:#000000"|
|colspan=2 |against all
|
|8.92%
|-
| colspan="5" style="background-color:#E9E9E9;"|
|- style="font-weight:bold"
| colspan="3" style="text-align:left;" | Total
| 
| 100%
|-
| colspan="5" style="background-color:#E9E9E9;"|
|- style="font-weight:bold"
| colspan="4" |Source:
|
|}

2003

|-
! colspan=2 style="background-color:#E9E9E9;text-align:left;vertical-align:top;" |Candidate
! style="background-color:#E9E9E9;text-align:left;vertical-align:top;" |Party
! style="background-color:#E9E9E9;text-align:right;" |Votes
! style="background-color:#E9E9E9;text-align:right;" |%
|-
|style="background-color:"|
|align=left|Viktor Kazakov
|align=left|United Russia
|
|61.38%
|-
|style="background-color:"|
|align=left|Valentin Romanov (incumbent)
|align=left|Communist Party
|
|23.80%
|-
|style="background-color:"|
|align=left|Gennady Petrikov
|align=left|Independent
|
|1.42%
|-
|style="background-color:#7C73CC"|
|align=left|Rinat Karimov
|align=left|Great Russia–Eurasian Union
|
|1.32%
|-
|style="background-color:#1042A5"|
|align=left|Vladimir Nenashev
|align=left|Union of Right Forces
|
|1.07%
|-
|style="background-color:"|
|align=left|Rinat Akhmedshin
|align=left|Independent
|
|0.88%
|-
|style="background-color:#164C8C"|
|align=left|Dmitry Suchkov
|align=left|United Russian Party Rus'
|
|0.84%
|-
|style="background-color:#000000"|
|colspan=2 |against all
|
|7.61%
|-
| colspan="5" style="background-color:#E9E9E9;"|
|- style="font-weight:bold"
| colspan="3" style="text-align:left;" | Total
| 
| 100%
|-
| colspan="5" style="background-color:#E9E9E9;"|
|- style="font-weight:bold"
| colspan="4" |Source:
|
|}

Notes

References 

Obsolete Russian legislative constituencies
Politics of Samara Oblast